Houria Bouteldja (born 5 January 5, 1973) is a French-Algerian political activist. She served as spokesperson for the  until 2020.

Life 
Born in  Constantine, Algeria on 5 January 1973, Houria Bouteldja emigrated with her parents to France when she was still a child. She is studying applied foreign languages in English and Arabic in Lyon. From 2001, she worked for the Institut du Monde Arabe.

She first took part in the Collectif Une école pour tou-te-s (CEPT). In 2004, in reaction to the speech of  Le mouvement ni putes ni soumises, she founded "les Blédardes", a movement positioning itself against the ban on the veil in schools, and defining a “paradoxical feminism of solidarity with the men” of her community.

The Indigènes de la République organized as a movement to denounce France's colonial past, to fight against the discrimination suffered by the "descendants of colonized populations" and, more broadly, against the racist and colonialist ideology which they argue underpins the current social policies of the French state.

On 24 October 2012, she was sprayed with paint by a man in front of the Institut du Monde Arabe, an action claimed the next day by the Jewish Defense League (LDJ), already implicated in two similar attacks. She lodged a complaint and her attacker, the webmaster of the LDJ, was sentenced in May 2016 to a 6-month suspended prison sentence and a fine of €8,500.

In 2014, she won the “combat against Islamophobia” prize from the Islamic Human Rights Commission.   Fiammetta Venner, and Caroline Fourest in 2003 described this association as “Islamist”.

Whites, Jews, and Us
Bouteldja is the author of Les Blancs, les Juifs et nous: Vers une politique de l'amour révolutionnaire (2016), translated into English in 2017 as Whites, Jews, and Us: Toward a Politics of Revolutionary Love. The book considers questions of solidarity, Jean-Paul Sartre's views on Israel and Palestinian self-determination, Islamophobia and anti-Semitism in Europe, the foreclosure of the possibility of solidarity between Jews and Arabs, and the status of women and people of colour in Europe.

Works 

 with Sadri Khiari, Félix Boggio Éwanjé-Épée et Stella Magliani-Belkacem, Nous sommes les indigènes de la République, Paris, Amsterdam, 2012, 435 p. + VIII
 Les Blancs, les Juifs et nous : vers une politique de l'amour révolutionnaire, Paris, La Fabrique, 2016, 143 p.
 Beaufs et barbares : Le pari du nous, Paris, La Fabrique, 2023, 270 p.

References 

1973 births
Algerian activists
Living people